The Yangtze giant softshell turtle (Rafetus swinhoei), also known as the Red River giant softshell turtle, the Shanghai softshell turtle, the speckled softshell turtle, and Swinhoe's softshell turtle, is an extremely rare species of turtle in the family Trionychidae. It may be the largest living freshwater turtle in the world. The species is endemic to eastern and southern China and northern Vietnam. Only two or three living individuals are known: one in China (captive) and one or two in Vietnam (wild). Following the deaths of a wild individual in Vietnam in January 2016 and a captive individual in China in 2019, the species is listed as critically endangered in the IUCN Red List. The female of the last breeding pair died at Suzhou Zoo in China in April 2019. A wild female was discovered in Vietnam on October 22, 2020, and another individual is believed to have been sighted in the same area.

Description
The Yangtze giant softshell turtle is noted for its deep head with a pig-like snout and dorsally placed eyes. This critically endangered species holds the title of being the largest freshwater turtle in the world. Although hard to compare due to the extremely small number of remaining specimens, its average and maximum sizes seem to exceed other large freshwater turtles such as alligator snapping turtles and related giant softshells such as other Rafetus and Pelochelys species. "Genetic variability of the critically endangered softshell turtle, Rafetus swinhoei: a preliminary report". pp. 84-92. In: Ngo DC, Ta HT, Le NN, Hoang XQ, Vo VP, Nguyen VS, Nguyen VT, Le TT, Tran QD (eds.) (2009). Proceedings of the First National Science Workshop on Amphibians and Reptiles in Vietnam. Hue: Hue University Press.</ref> However, along the curve carapace lengths of up to  have been reported and it is possible for the largest specimens (largely reported in Vietnam) to have weighed up . The male is generally smaller than the female and has a longer, larger tail.

Geographic range
The Yangtze giant softshell turtle has been known to inhabit the Yangtze River and Lake Tai, situated on the border of Jiangsu and Zhejiang Provinces, in eastern China, and Gejiu, Yuanyang, Jianshui and Honghe in Yunnan Province in southern China.

A specimen at the Beijing Zoo died in 2005, and another one at the Shanghai Zoo died in 2006; both of them were caught at Gejiu in the 1970s. In 1999, 2000, and 2005, turtles re-emerged from Hoan Kiem Lake in Hanoi and were seen by a large audience and caught on film. Only a single turtle was believed to be left in the lake. In April 2011, it was captured because it had open sores (possibly due to refuse and pollution in the lake, injuries from fishing hooks or other turtles) that needed to be treated. It was reported dead in January 2016. On April 13, 2019, the only female turtle in Suzhou Zoo was reported dead shortly after the latest fertilization process. In 2020, another female was found in Vietnam's Dong Mo Lake, and it is believed that another individual is also living at the lake. They may also be still another individual in nearby Xuan Khanh Lake.

Ecology and behaviour
Diet
R. swinhoei eats fish, crabs, snails, water hyacinth, frogs, and "green rice leaves".

Reproduction
The Yangtze giant softshell turtle may lay from 20 to more than 80 eggs. It nests at night and during the morning.

A fertile female from the Changsha Zoo was introduced to the only known male in China, a 100-year-old individual in the Suzhou Zoo, in 2008. The female, who is over 80 years old, was said to settle in well after her 1000-kilometre (600-mile) move, and biologists were optimistic for breeding success. The move was coordinated by the Wildlife Conservation Society and the Turtle Survival Alliance. In July 2013 National Geographic reported that in the sixth breeding season for the Suzhou mating pair, 80 eggs have been laid, but none was fertile.

 Behavior 
Despite its massive size and distinctive appearance, this species is extremely secretive and only rarely comes up to breathe, largely preferring to stay submerged deep underwater. This may be part of the reason why it is so difficult to positively identify and confirm wild sightings of this species.

Relationship with humans
Scientific description and systematics

The species became known to Western science in 1873, when John Edward Gray, the turtle expert at the British Museum, described the specimen sent to him from Shanghai by English biologist Robert Swinhoe. He named the species Oscaria swinhoei, and described it as "the most beautiful species of Trionychidae that has yet occurred."

In 1880, the Shanghai-based French Jesuit Pierre Marie Heude obtained several specimens of this turtle, from the Huangpu River (near Shanghai) and Lake Tai (near Suzhou). He thought them sufficiently different from each other to describe them as five distinct species: Yuen leprosus, Yuen maculatus, Yuen elegans, Yuen viridis, and Yuen pallens. The genus name, Yuen, presumably comes from the Chinese 鼋 (transcribed yüen in the Wade-Giles system, or yuan in the modern Hanyu Pinyin), which means a large turtle.

Later zoologists classified these turtles as belonging to the genera Trionyx, Pelodiscus, and Pelochelys; in 1987, Meylan categorized this species under the genus Rafetus.

The placement of the related or conspecific Hoan Kiem turtle, Rafetus leloii, remains poorly known and controversial. Most herpetologists accept R. leloii is a junior synonym of the Yangtze giant softshell turtle, though some Vietnamese biologists, such as Ha Dinh Duc, who first described R. leloii, and Le Tran Binh, assert R. leloii to be distinct. Le points out genetic differences, as well as differences in morphology. However, Farkas et al. repeated their 2003 conclusion in 2011, attributing differences between specimens to age, and pointed out that the genetic sequences used were never sent to GenBank. They also criticized the fact that Le et al. violated ICZN Code by renaming the species from R. leloii to R. vietnamensis on the grounds of "appropriateness".

Key threats
The Yangtze giant softshell turtle is on the brink of extinction due to habitat loss, legal overtrade, lack of legislation to control these wildlife trading, trafficking, the human food preferences, hunting for subsistence and local consumption, and the use of the carapace and bones in alternative medicine. Skulls are often kept as trophies. A recent plan to build hydropower cascade of 12 dams on the Red River in China may flood all of its habitat and change the ecosystem of lower Vietnam.

Conservation efforts

 Captive breeding 
Conservation efforts are concentrated on breeding captive turtles in China and searching for live specimens in the wild. An agreement was made to transfer the only known remaining female specimen located at the Changsha Zoo to the Suzhou Zoo to breed with the male specimen there. Also, efforts are being made to improve conditions for breeding at both the Suzhou Zoo and Western Temple in Suzhou.
A workshop on the Rafetus Conservation at Yunnan was held by CI-Shanshui. Local Chinese scientists are searching for the last existent individuals. The two specimens were able to produce two clutches of eggs, with over half of them being fertile, though all of them perished before hatching. The Turtle Survival Alliance released a statement saying, "A number of the eggs had very thin shells, suggesting that the diet of the animals prior to breeding was not optimal." The two turtles were prepared for another round of mating, while being fed a high-calcium diet in an effort to strengthen the eggs. Liu Jinde, the director of the zoo said, "We've worked very hard on this, We ought to succeed. The turtles are very healthy."

The scientists began preparing to mate the two once again in May 2009, which fell within this species' breeding season, but in the fall of 2009, the zoo announced that despite laying 188 eggs, the eggs were infertile and would not hatch. The Turtle Survival Alliance issued a statement explaining the infertility was due in part to the turtle's poor diet and the group expressed concern that the zoo's patrons had thrown trash into the turtle's enclosure that, if eaten, could endanger the health of the turtles. On June 15, 2010, the female laid a total of 63 eggs. Half of the eggs were left in the sand to incubate naturally, while the other half were moved to incubate at varying temperatures and humidities. Once again, they were infertile.

In 2015 artificial insemination was attempted, a first for this species. In May 2015, the female was successfully inseminated. Semen was extracted from the sedated male using electro-ejaculation. By late July, the female had laid 2 clutches of eggs, totaling 89 eggs, but none were viable. The female later died in April 2019 following another artificial insemination attempt.

 Surveys for surviving specimens 
As of mid-2017, conservationists are searching for any possible wild individuals in the remote parts of China. A major target of the survey are parts of the Red River in Yunnan Province. Locals in the area have reported seeing 1-2 turtles that have a similar description to that of this species, meaning that there is a small possibility the species may still survive in the wild. In Oct. 2018, the Asian Turtle Program announced that it was interviewing local people to collect data to guideline searches for R. swinhoei in the very large area of flooded valleys formed by damming the Da River.

 Rediscovered individuals 
In April 2018, conservationists confirmed the existence of a second wild individual in Xuan Khanh Lake, Vietnam. The individual was photographed two times in 2012 and 2017, but both times the photograph was blurry and provided little confirmation of its identity. Using traces of the turtle's DNA in the lake's water, the specimen's identity was confirmed as R. swinhoei.   In Nov. 2018, it was announced that a second, smaller individual of R. swinhoei also lives in Dong Mo Lake; this individual had long been confused with the larger turtle until the summer of 2018, when both turtles were seen raising their heads out of the water at the same time. In 2020, a survey at Dong Mo managed to capture one of the turtles and obtain genetic samples, and found that it was a female, representing the first known female R. swinhoei since the death of the captive female in 2019.

There are also several other modern accounts of surviving individuals of R. swinhoei, although most of these are unverified or have not been followed up on. Following the creation of the Madushan Dam in China's Yunnan Province, local fishermen regularly reported sightings of one to two very large softshell turtles in the reservoir. However, extensive surveys in 2016 and 2017 were unsuccessful in finding any such turtles. At some point prior to 2015, a survey team from the conservation group Turtle Island apparently managed to locate an individual of R. swinhoei in a section of the Red River between two reservoirs. However, the individual was never trapped and was at high risk of being caught by fishermen. Another search by the same group found a pond in Laos where a R. swinhoei had apparently lived for over 45 years before a monsoon in 2013, during which the individual moved to a nearby river and was never seen again.

The legend of Kim Qui

The specimen (which may be a distinct species R. leloii) located in Hoan Kiem Lake, in Hanoi is thought to be the legendary Kim Qui (金龜), or Golden Turtle God, who has appeared at opportune moments throughout Vietnamese history. The golden turtle first appeared during the reign of King An Dương Vương (257–207 BC) and assisted the king in the construction of defenses for the ancient capital of Co Loa. When Co Loa was attacked, Kim Qui assisted the king in making a magical cross-bow that massively rained arrows upon the invaders in only a single shot. When the King's daughter conspired against her father, Kim Qui emerged again to inform An Duong Vuong of the betrayal; the king consequently killed his daughter and drowned himself in the sea.

In the 15th century, a gentry named Lê Lợi obtained a magical sword named Heaven's Will that a fisherman had pulled out of the lake. Lê Lợi used this sword to lead a rebellion against the Chinese armies that were in occupation of Vietnam. After overthrowing the Chinese rule and establishing the Lê dynasty, the now-emperor Lê Lợi returned to the lake and Kim Qui emerged, then asked Lê Lợi to return the sword. The King drew the sword and hurled it toward Kim Qui. Kim Qui quickly caught the sword by his teeth, then submerged. Lê Lợi afterwards named the lake 'Lake of Returning Sword', or Hoan Kiem.

References

Further reading
Meylan PA. "Rafetus swinhoei ". In'': Pritchard P, Rhodin AGJ (eds.). The Conservation Biology of Freshwater Turtles. : IUCN Publications.
Meylan PA, Webb RG (1988). "Rafetus swinhoei (Gray) 1873, a valid species of living soft-shelled turtle (family Trionychidae) from China". Journal of Herpetology'' 22: 118–119.

External links

China's Turtles, Emblems of a Crisis - The New York Times
Species: Rafetus swinhoei - Asian Turtle Conservation Network
Video: The Loneliest Animals - "The Last Living Pair of Rafetus Turtles" - PBS
 
Rafetus swinhoei - IUCN Red List of Threatened Species
In Search of Rafetus swinhoei - Turtle Conservation Vietnam
It's love or bust for Yangtze turtles - The Observer
Picture :th:ภาพ:Rafetus thanh hoar.jpg

Rafetus
Critically endangered fauna of Asia
Turtles of Asia
Reptiles of China
Reptiles of Vietnam
Fauna of Yunnan
Reptiles described in 1873
Taxa named by John Edward Gray
Critically endangered fauna of China